The European Journal of Vascular and Endovascular Surgery is a monthly peer-reviewed journal publishing articles describing endovascular methods and their critical evaluation. According to the Journal Citation Reports, the journal has a 2019 impact factor of 5.328.

References

English-language journals